Charles O. Baumann (January 20, 1874 – July 18, 1931) was an American film producer, film studio executive, and pioneer in the motion picture industry.

Biography

Career
He was a partner in the Crescent Film Company formed in 1908 and in the Bison Life Motion Pictures production company formed in 1909. In 1912, he was a founder and the first president of Universal Film Manufacturing Company (now Universal Studios).

One of his most-successful companies was the Keystone Film Company, the production unit headed by Mack Sennett, which produced the first films to feature Charlie Chaplin. Adam Kessel and Baumann's New York Motion Picture Company produced many films under a number of brand names, including Broncho, Domino and Kay-Bee Pictures. Other companies formed by Baumann include the 101 Bison Company and Reliance Motion Picture Corporation.

In the mid-1910s, Kessel and Baumann also branched into film distribution with their Mutual Film Corporation, which later was absorbed into Triangle Film Corporation. Baumann continued in production in the early 1920s as a partner in the Kessel-Baumann Picture Corporation production company.

Death
He died on July 18, 1931 of influenza in New York City.

References

Further reading
 The Moving Picture World, archived issues at Media History Digital Library at archive.org
 Lahue, Kalton (1971); Mack Sennett's Keystone: The Man, the Myth and the Comedies; New York: Barnes & Co.;  (p. 17-42, 64, 109, 155, 241, 242, 289)
 MacGowan, Kenneth (1965); Behind The Screen: The History and Techniques of the Motion Picture; New York: Dell Publishing Co. (pg.171, 175, 208)

External links

 Charles O. Baumann at Silent Era. Retrieved 2013-01-14.
 
 http://www.fortleefilm.org
 Testimony of Charles O. Baumann in the 1914 Federal hearings into the Motion Picture Patents Company.

1874 births
1931 deaths
Businesspeople from New York City
American film producers
American film studio executives
American people of Polish-Jewish descent
Cinema pioneers
American film production company founders
NBCUniversal people